Camouflage Heart is the debut album from Cindytalk released by Midnight Music in 1984. The album reached #22 in the UK Indie Chart

Track listing
 It's Luxury 
 Instinct (Backtosense) 
 Under Glass 
 Memories Of Skin And Snow 
 The Spirit Behind The Circus Dream 
 The Ghost Never Smiles 
 A Second Breath 
 Everybody Is Christ 
 Disintegrate...

Gordon Sharp - voice and instruments
David Clancy - instruments
John Byrne - instruments
Mick Harvey - drumming on "Under glass"

Versions
 LP 1984 Midnight Music, Cat# CHIME 00.06 S
 CD 1988 Midnight Music, Cat# CHIME 00.06 CD
 CD 1996 Touched Recordings/World Serpent, Cat# Touch 3

References
 

1984 debut albums
Dark wave albums
Cindytalk albums